Qaleh Now-e Mastufi (also Romanized as Qal‘eh Now-e Mastūfī; also known as Qal‘eh Now) is a village in Pain Velayat Rural District, in the Central District of Torbat-e Heydarieh County, Razavi Khorasan Province, Iran. At the 2006 census, its population was 89, in 26 families.

References 

Populated places in Torbat-e Heydarieh County